Papadiamantopoulos is a surname of Greek origin. People having this surname include:

Ioannis Papadiamantopoulos (elder) (1766-1826), Greek revolutionary leader
Jean Moréas (born Ioannis A. Papadiamantopoulos), poet

Greek-language surnames
Surnames
Patronymic surnames